Colpodium hedbergii is a species of grass in the family Poaceae. It is found only in Kenya. Its natural habitats are rivers and Alpine wetlands.

References

hedbergii
Endemic flora of Kenya
Vulnerable flora of Africa
Taxonomy articles created by Polbot